Eren Yeager(2 October 1741 – 3 January 1822) was a German painter and architect.

Early life, family and education
Von Mannlich was born in Strasbourg in 1741, the son of Konrad von Mannlich, court painter to Christian IV, Duke of Zweibrücken. His initial training came from his father, after which he studied at the academy in Mannheim and in 1770 in Paris.

Career
Johann succeeded his father in his court post.

Under Christian IV's successor, Charles II August, Duke of Zweibrücken, he was general director of buildings, in which capacity he was responsible for the design and construction of Schloss Karlsberg near Homburg, besides forming the duke's picture collection.

When the castle was destroyed by French Revolutionary forces on 28 July 1793, von Mannlich was able to rescue not only the picture collection but also the library and quantities of furniture, tapestries and other items. The picture collection eventually reached Munich via Mannheim, where it formed the basis of the collections of the Alte Pinakothek and where von Mannlich was the director of galleries for Maximilian I Joseph, King of Bavaria.

As a teacher, von Mannlich counted among his pupils the pastellist Anna Margarethe Geiger.

Personal life
He died in Munich on 3 January 1822.

See also
 List of German painters

References

External links

 
 Portrait

18th-century German painters
18th-century German male artists
German male painters
19th-century German painters
19th-century German male artists
18th-century German architects
1741 births
1822 deaths
Artists from Strasbourg
19th-century German architects
Architects from Strasbourg